The Lafayette Wildcatters were a professional indoor football team based in Lafayette, Louisiana and a charter member of the Southern Indoor Football League (SIFL). They played their home games at the Cajundome, the Wildcatters are Lafayette's second attempt at an indoor/arena football team following the af2's Lafayette Roughnecks, the Roughnecks folded after their single season of 2001.

In their inaugural season, the Wildcatters were known as the Acadiana Mudbugs.  They were the only team to start out 3–0 and locked up the No. 3 seed for the SIFL's first ever playoffs. On July 18, 2009, the Mudbugs lost 56–49 to the Austin Turfcats in the playoff semi-finals in the SIFL's first overtime game.

The Wildcatters began their 2010 season with a 44–28 loss to the Greenville Force.  Four days later, head coach John Fourcade was let go and the team signed former AFL coach Skip Foster to lead the team.

The Wildcatters canceled their 2011 season due to the lack of having sufficient Workers Compensation Insurance. By the time their announced return of 2012 had come, the SIFL had broken up.

Season-by-season

|-
| colspan="6" align="center" |  Acadiana Mudbugs (SIFL)
|-
|2009 || 6 || 5 || 0 || 3rd League || Lost Semi-finals (Austin)
|-
| colspan="6" align="center" |  Lafayette Wildcatters (SIFL)
|-
|2010 || 6 || 5 || 0 || 3rd League || Lost Semi-finals (Columbus)
|-
|2011 || rowspan="1" colspan="5" align="center" valign="middle" |Did Not Play
|-
|2012 || – || – || – || – || –
|-
!Totals || 12 || 12 || 0
|colspan="2"| (including playoffs)
|}

2009 Schedule/results

2010 Schedule/results

Head coaches

Roster
 2009 All-league performer ( * )
 2010 All-league performer ( # )

References

External links
 Official website
 2009 Team stats
 2010 Team stats

American football teams in Louisiana
Defunct indoor American football teams
Southern Indoor Football League teams
Wildcatters
2010 establishments in Louisiana
2011 disestablishments in Louisiana
American football teams established in 2010
American football teams disestablished in 2011